Love and Distance is the third release from the Portland-based band The Helio Sequence.  It was released on June 8, 2004 by Sub Pop Records.

Track listing
"Harmonica Song" – 5:50
"Repeater" – 4:22
"Don't Look Away" – 4:11
"Let It Fall Apart" – 4:57
"Everyone Knows Everyone" – 3:36
"The People of the Secret" – 4:38
"Blood Bleeds" – 4:25
"S.O.S." – 4:50
"So Stop!" – 4:18
"Looks Good (But You Looked Away)" – 5:43

External links
 Love and Distance review at PopMatters
Love At Distance: 6 Reasons To Participate.

2004 albums
The Helio Sequence albums